Silk Hosiery is a 1920 American silent comedy film directed by Fred Niblo and starring Enid Bennett. A print listed as being in nitrate exists in the Library of Congress and another in the UCLA Film and Television Archive.

Plot
As summarized in a film publication, Marjorie Bowen (Bennett) is a model who longs for romance and adventure of the story book variety, but never gets further than displaying gowns at an ultra-fashionable clothing shop. Every customer who comes in is buying a gown for a ball thrown by some Prince. Yvette (Pavis), a French woman, comes to order a gown and brings her fiance Sir Leeds (Webb), who immediately attracts Marjorie's attention, but she loses hope after she hears that he is engaged. Marjorie stays alone in the shop to deliver the gown to Yvette and dresses herself in the costume. Some crook business follows in which Yvette and an idler are implicated. Marjorie gets mixed up in it and ends up kidnapped and in a room with Sir Leeds, who tries to explain what happened. They escape and Marjorie impresses the Prince (Ghent) by recovering a note and piece of jewelry that the Prince had indiscreetly given a New York society woman and which he feared would be used against him. Leeds turns out to be a detective. He asks Marjorie to marry him.

Cast
 Enid Bennett - Marjorie Bowen
 Geoffrey Webb - Sir Derwain Leeds
 Marie Pavis - Yvette Fernau
 Donald MacDonald - Cadwallader Smith
 Derek Ghent - Prince Ferdinandi (as Derrick Ghent)
 Otto Hoffman - Van Twiller
 Joan Standing - Sophia Black
 Verne Winter - Billy Black (as Vern Winters)
 Harold Holland - Jim Shanahan
 Bonnie Hill - Mollie Milligan
 Sylvia Brooks - Mrs. De Windt
 Rose Dione - Mme. Louise

References

External links

Silk Hosiery; allmovie.com/synopsis

1920 films
1920 comedy films
Silent American comedy films
American silent feature films
American black-and-white films
Films directed by Fred Niblo
1920s American films